Piyanets Ridge (‘Rid Piyanets’ \'rid pi-ya-'nets\) is the upturned V-shaped, mostly ice-free ridge extending 5.6 km in north-south direction, 2.4 km wide and rising to 590 m in Havre Mountains, northern Alexander Island in Antarctica. It surmounts Kolokita Cove to the southwest. The feature is named after the region of Piyanets in Western Bulgaria.

Location

Maps
 British Antarctic Territory. Scale 1:200000 topographic map. DOS 610 – W 69 70. Tolworth, UK, 1971
 Antarctic Digital Database (ADD). Scale 1:250000 topographic map of Antarctica. Scientific Committee on Antarctic Research (SCAR). Since 1993, regularly upgraded and updated

Notes

References
 Bulgarian Antarctic Gazetteer. Antarctic Place-names Commission. (details in Bulgarian, basic data in English)
 Piyanets Ridge. SCAR Composite Gazetteer of Antarctica

External links
 Piyanets Ridge. Copernix satellite image

Ridges of Alexander Island
Bulgaria and the Antarctic